Camp Belknap was a military camp during the Mexican–American War.

History 
When war was declared on Mexico in May 1846, Congress authorized the raising of 50,00 volunteer troop to supplement the regular army. General Zachary Taylor was inundated with the volunteer soldiers arriving at Brazos Santiago, and was forced to place them in temporary encampments. In the summer of 1846, Camp Belknap was built on a long narrow rise of land. At its peak, it held 7,000–8,000 troops from eight different states.

Despite one false alarm, no enemy attack took place. By September, most of the volunteers had either moved further upriver. By December 1846, the camp was completely empty.

External links 
 Camp Bellknap Handbook of Texas Online

Mexican–American War
Buildings and structures in Young County, Texas